Events in the year 1998 in Norway.

Incumbents
 Monarch – Harald V
 Prime Minister – Kjell Magne Bondevik (Christian Democratic Party)

Events

26 September – Christian Conservative Party merged with the New Future Coalition Party to form the Christian fundamentalist party Christian Unity Party.
7 October – Operations cease at Oslo Airport, Fornebu
8 October – The main airport serving Oslo is moved from the Fornebu airport to the all-new Gardermoen airport.

Popular culture

Sports

Music

Film

Literature

Television

Notable births
 
14 February – Sander Berge, footballer
8 March – Jenny Stene, sport shooter.
17 April – Anna Odine Strøm, ski jumper.
10 June – Johan-Sebastian Christiansen, chess player.
20 June – Kajsa Vickhoff Lie, alpine skier.
21 July – Magnus Bøe, cross-country skier (born in South Korea)
6 August – Einar Lurås Oftebro, Nordic combined skier 
30 September – Narve Gilje Nordås, athlete competing in middle-distance and long-distance events.
17 December – Martin Ødegaard, footballer

Notable deaths

8 January – Audun Hetland, illustrator (born 1920).
26 January – Olaf Kortner, politician (b.1920)
28 January – Asbjørn Berg-Hansen, boxer (b.1912)
18 February – Rolv Ryssdal, judge (b.1914)
1 April – Anne Gullestad, actress and theatre director (b.1925)
3 April – Paul Svarstad, politician (b.1917)
8 June – Eva R. Finstad, politician (b.1933)
13 June – Birger Ruud, ski jumper, twice Olympic gold medallist and three time World Champion (b.1911)
17 June – Aage Eriksen, wrestler and Olympic silver medallist (b.1917)
28 June – Brita Collett Paus, humanitarian leader and founder of Fransiskushjelpen (b.1917)
9 July – Knut Bergsland, linguist (b.1914)
9 July – Halvor J. Sandsdalen, farmer, journalist, poet, novelist, playwright and children's writer (b. 1911).
18 July – Lars Mathias Hille Esmark, civil servant and business person in the tourist industry (born 1908).
19 July – Rune Nilsen, triple jumper (b.1923)
26 July – Olav Bø, folklorist (born 1918).
30 July – Axel Buch, politician (b.1930)
30 July – Laila Schou Nilsen, speed skater, alpine skier and tennis player (b.1919)
31 July – Erling Evensen, cross country skier and Olympic bronze medallist (b.1914)
23 August – Rolf Søder, actor (b.1918)
1 September – Eystein Bærug, politician (b.1923)
13 September – Trygve Moe, politician (b.1920)
16 September – John Systad, long-distance runner (b.1912)
26 September – Gudrun Dorothea Ræder, diplomat (born 1908).
1 October – Sjur Lindebrække, banker and politician (b.1909)
5 October – Arne Øien, economist, politician and Minister (b.1928)
13 October – Thomas Byberg, speed skater and Olympic silver medallist (b.1916)
27 October – Reidar Kvammen, international soccer player (b.1914)
2 November – Sverre Brodahl, Nordic skier and Olympic silver medallist (b.1909)
11 November – Sam Melberg, sports diver and sports instructor (b. 1912).
12 November – Bjørn Endreson, actor, stage producer and theatre director (b.1922)
15 November – Asbjørn Øye, politician (b.1902)
4 December – Egil Johansen, jazz drummer, teacher, composer and arranger (b.1934)
4 December – Lilli Gjerløw, archivist (b.1910).
10 December – Trygve Haugeland, politician and Minister (b.1914)
31 December – Erling Norvik, politician (b.1928)

Full date unknown
Øystein Elgarøy, astronomer (b.1929)
Yngvar Løchen, sociologist (b.1931)

See also

References

External links

 
Norway